John Barkley Rosser Jr. (April 12, 1948 - January 10, 2023) was a mathematical economist and Professor of Economics at James Madison University in Harrisonburg, Virginia since 1988. He was known for work in nonlinear economic dynamics, including applications in economics of catastrophe theory, chaos theory, and complexity theory (complex dynamics, complexity economics).  With Marina V. Rosser he invented the concept of the "new traditional economy".  He introduced into economic discourse the concepts of chaotic bubbles, chaotic hysteresis (op. cit., p. 326), and econochemistry.  He also invented the concepts of the megacorpstate and hypercyclic morphogenesis. He was the first to provide a mathematical model of the period of financial distress in a speculative bubble. With Marina V. Rosser and Ehsan Ahmed, he was the first to argue for a two-way positive link between income inequality (economic inequality) and the size of an underground economy in a nation. Rosser's equation has been used to forecast ratios of future Social Security benefits to current ones in real terms.

Background and personal life
Born in Ithaca, New York, Rosser received a BA in economics with a minor in mathematics in 1969, an MA in economics in 1972, and a Ph.D. in economics in 1976, studying with Eugene Smolensky, all from the University of Wisconsin–Madison.

On August 15, 1984 he became legally engaged to the former Marina Rostislavovna Vcherashnaya in Moscow, USSR, officially set to be married at 3 PM, November 13, 1984.  After he returned to the United States, she was forced to resign from her position as Senior Researcher in the Institute of World Economy and International Relations (IMEMO).  He was not granted a visa to return to Moscow to marry her, making them into a blocked marriage case.  This violated the Helsinki Accords, signed by the Soviet Union in 1975.  After diplomatic efforts, linked to the emerging perestroika program of Soviet leader, Mikhail Gorbachev, their case was resolved when Marina was allowed to travel to the United States on April 4, 1987.  This was the first resolution of such a case in the Soviet Union, and became a precedent helping to establish in international law more generally the right of people to marry freely whom they choose across national boundaries. They married on May 24, 1987, and she is now Professor of Economics at James Madison University also.

His father was the late J. Barkley Rosser Sr. (1907–1989), a prominent mathematician.

Career
Rosser joined the economics department at James Madison University in Harrisonburg, Virginia in 1977, where he has been Professor of Economics since 1988 and Kirby L. Cramer Jr. Professor Business Administration since 1996.  He has published several books and over 200 journal articles, book chapters, and book reviews in a wide variety of sub-fields of economics (see External Link for recent papers and complete cv). He served as Editor of the Journal of Economic Behavior and Organization from 2001–2010. In 2012 he became Founding Editor-in-Chief of the Review of Behavioral Economics. As of 2018, he is also Coeditor of New Palgrave Dictionary of Economics, 4th edition.

In 2009, Rosser was named a Fellow of Economists for Peace and Security. In 2010 he received a festschrift, Nonlinear Dynamics in Economics, Finance, and the Social Sciences: Essays in Honour of John Barkley Rosser Jr., edited by Gian-Italo Bischi, Carl Chiarella, and Laura Gardini, Berlin Heidelberg: Springer. In 2011, he received an Outstanding Faculty Award from the State Council on Higher Education in Virginia. In 2012 he was named Ambassador of the University of Urbino, Italy.  Since 2007 he has blogged at Econospeak, http://econospeak.blogspot.com.

In 2019, Rosser was elected President of the Society for Chaos Theory in Psychology and Life Sciences.

References

External links
 John Barkley Rosser Jr.'s Home Page

1948 births
Living people
21st-century American economists
University of Wisconsin–Madison College of Letters and Science alumni
James Madison University faculty